This is a list of Spanish football transfers for the 2008–09 season of La Liga and Segunda División. The summer transfer window opened July 1, 2008 and closed on August 31, 2008. The mid-season winter transfer window will open on January 1, 2009 and run for the entire month until January 31, 2009. Players without a club could join one, either during or in between transfer windows. Although transfer made be confirmed before the opening day of each transfer window, they were not officially a member of the squad until the first day of each transfer window.

Summer 2008 transfer window

See also
List of Spanish football transfers winter 2008–09

References

Football transfers summer 2008
2008
2008
Trans
2008